Dercylidas (Greek: Δερκυλίδας) was a Spartan commander during the 5th and 4th century BC.  For his cunning and inventiveness, he was nicknamed Sisyphus.  In 411 BC he was appointed harmost at Abydos. In 399 BC, he was advised by Antisthenes of Sparta that his command would be prolonged for another year at least. From 399 BC to 397 BC, Dercylidas superseded Thibron and led the Spartans through Thrace to the west coast of Asia, where he plundered Bithynia and Eolia.  After allying himself with Tissaphernes and Meidias, Dercylidas attacked Pharnabazus.  In 396 BC, King Agesilaus sent Dercylidas from Amphipolis to the Hellespont. In 394 BC, Dercylidas was himself succeeded by King Agesilaus as supreme commander of the Spartan fleet.

References

 Xenophon, Hellenica Books I and III.

4th-century BC Spartans
Ancient Spartan generals
5th-century BC Spartans
Harmosts
Spartans of the Peloponnesian War